HNLMS De Ruyter was a light cruiser of the Royal Netherlands Navy. She was originally designed as a  ship with a lighter armament due to financial problems and the pacifist movement. Later in the design stage, an extra gun turret was added and the armor was improved. She was the seventh ship of the Dutch Navy to be named after Admiral Michiel Adriaenszoon de Ruyter.

De Ruyter was laid down on 16 September 1933 at the Wilton-Fijenoord dockyard in Schiedam and commissioned on 3 October 1936, commanded by Captain A. C. van der Sande Lacoste. She was sunk in the Battle of the Java Sea in 1942.

Design
De Ruyter was designed during the Great Depression, which, in addition to being a period of economic depression, was also a period in which pacifism was widespread in the Netherlands. For these reasons, the design was officially called a flottieljeleider (flotilla leader) instead of a cruiser, and every effort was made to cut costs.

However, due to the cost-cutting policy that went into her design, De Ruyter was not quite up to her task. Her main battery (7 × 150 mm guns) was underpowered in comparison to other light cruisers of the time (for example the British ), and the class had inadequate armour as well and lacked long range anti-aircraft guns. However, her fire control system was excellent.

Service history
During World War II, De Ruyter saw repeated action in the Dutch East Indies in fruitless attempts to ward off the Japanese invasion. She was damaged by air attack in the Battle of Bali Sea on 4 February 1942, but not seriously. She fought in the Battle of Badung Strait on 18 February.

In the Battle of the Java Sea on 27 February, De Ruyter was the flagship of the Dutch Rear-Admiral Karel Doorman, with his flag captain Eugène Lacomblé (who had previously served on board the ship as a lieutenant). Several minutes after the Dutch cruiser Java had been torpedoed and sunk, De Ruyter was hit by a single Type 93 torpedo fired by Haguro at about 23:40 and was set on fire; the torpedo also disabled the ship's electrical systems and left the crew unable to combat the fire or the flooding. The De Ruyter sank at about 02:30 the next morning with the loss of 367 men, including Admiral Doorman and Captain Lacomblé.

Wreck
The wreck of De Ruyter was discovered by specialist wreck divers on 1 December 2002 and declared a war grave, with the ship's two bells—one now in the Kloosterkerk in the Hague—being recovered. The same dive group then found   on 12 August 2004.

In 2016 it was discovered that the wrecks of De Ruyter and Java, and much of Kortenaer had disappeared from the seabed, although their imprints on the ocean floor remained. Over 100 ships and submarines of various countries sank during the war in the seas around Indonesia, Singapore and Malaysia; many are designated as war graves. There is known to be illegal scavenging of these wrecks, often using explosives; the Netherlands Defence Ministry suggested that De Ruyter, Java, and  Kortenaer may have been illegally salvaged. In February 2017 a report was issued confirming the salvaging of the three wrecks.

According to Indonesian journalist Aqwam Hanifan, the remains of Dutch sailors on De Ruyter and the other illegally salvaged ships were dumped in a mass grave in east Java.

References in text

References
 van Oosten, Franz Christiaan. "Her Netherlands Majesty's Ship De Ruyter." In Profile Warship, edited by Anthony Preston, 73-96. Windsor: Profile Publishing, 1974. . .

External links

 Tabular record of movement
 De Ruyter-class cruiser

Cruisers of the Royal Netherlands Navy
1935 ships
Ships built by Wilton-Fijenoord
 
World War II cruisers of the Netherlands
World War II shipwrecks in the Java Sea
Maritime incidents in February 1942